There are a number of sites known as the Tombs of the Kings:

Tombs of the Kings (Paphos), Cyprus
Tombs of the Kings (Jerusalem), East Jerusalem
Tombs of the kings of Pontus, Amasya, Turkey

See also
Valley of the Kings, Egypt